Tebi ljubavi (To You, My Love) is the seventh studio album by Bosnian folk singer Hanka Paldum. It was released 27 March 1984 through the record label Jugodisk.

Track listing
Pamtim još
Moraš doći ove noći
Miris kose
Samo jednom ja odlazim
Pusti me, majko
Sarajevo, ostadoh bez riječi
Lažno su me voljele crne oči
Noćas si bol, noćas si želja
Dugo, dugo toplo ljeto
Balada mojoj majci
Prva ljubav

References

1984 albums
Hanka Paldum albums
Jugodisk albums